John Arundel (died 1504) was a medieval Bishop of Coventry and Lichfield and Bishop of Exeter.

Biography
Arundel was the son of Renfry Arundell, High Sheriff of Cornwall and was educated at the college of Canons Augustine in St. Columb and at Exeter College, Oxford.

Arundel was appointed a Canon of Windsor in 1479, a position he held until 1496.

After graduating with a Masters in Arts, Arundel was ordained and presented as rector to St. Columb Major. From 1482 to 1496 he served as Dean of Exeter and on 3 August 1496 was nominated as Bishop of Coventry and Lichfield and consecrated on 30 November 1496. He was translated to Exeter on 5 July 1502.

Arundel died in London in 1504 and lies buried in St. Clement's Church without Temple Bar.

See also
 Arundell family

Citations

References

 

John (1504)
Deans of Exeter
Bishops of Coventry and Lichfield
Bishops of Exeter
Canons of Windsor
16th-century English Roman Catholic bishops
15th-century English Roman Catholic bishops
15th-century births

Year of birth unknown
1504 deaths